Nuruddin Sarki (5 March 1927 – 2007) was a Pakistani lawyer. Sarki was born in Shikarpur, Sindh. His father was Kamal-Uddin Sarki.

Education
Primary Education at Nadir School, Kazi Mohalla, Shikarpur (Sindh).

Matriculation Examination in 1945 from Bombay University (India) with Distinction marks in three subjects through Government High School, Shikarpur (Sindh)

Intermediate Examination from C & S (Chelaram & Sitaldas) College, Shikarpur Sindh in the year 1947.

First Year (Engineering) Examination from N.E.D. Engineering University, Karachi in the year 1948.

B.A. (Hon) from C & S Government College Shikarpur in the year 1953.

M.A. Examination from S.M. Arts College, Karachi in the year 1955.

LL.B from S.M. Law College, Karachi in the year 1957.

Professional career
He was employed as a teacher in the year 1951 to 1953 in the New Era High School, Shikarpur (Sindh).
He was an Assistant Professor/Professor from 1954 to 1967 at Islamia Arts College, Karachi.
He was then an advocate from 1957 till 26-09-2007.

Personal life
He married in the year 1957 from Siddiqui family of Sukkur (Sindh) which was also literary family. His marriage was arranged marriage with Mst. Shams Siddiqui who was an M.A. in Urdu. She was a housewife but had written and compiled short stories.
They had two daughters, Shehla and Shahista, and one on Shahab Sarki who is at present a Lawyer at the supreme court of Pakistan.
His father died in 1930 when Nuruddin was seven years old.

Social and political activities

Just after passing Matriculation Examination in the year 1945 he had joined "Muslim Student Federation at Shikarpur". Sarki had played a very active role in the Federation.
Consequently, he was elevated as Joint Secretary then as General Secretary from 1945 to 1948 and from this platform, he along with other like minded friends, had established a library with the name of “Moulana Muhammad Ali Library” at Shikarpur.

He had then joined Communist party in the year 1948. He took full-time active part in this party by participating in its meetings & congregations in Karachi and Lahore as well. In the year 1949 he had participated in the first Conference of “Associations of Anjuman-E-Tarakipasand Writers” at Lahore. In 1949 he, along with his friends, published a Sindhi New paper “SADAQAT” which was not only political but literary as well. In 1951 he could not continue his studies in N.E.D Engineering College, Karachi due to involvement in student politics on the platform of “Muslim Student Federation”. Later on he was constrained to leave the Engineering College Karachi and he had made his mind not to be Government Servant and had returned to Shikarpur where he passed his B.A.(Hon). Again he returned to Karachi in the year 1953 where he started his career as lecturer in the Islamia Arts College, Karachi where he passed his M.A. and LL.B Examinations in the year 1955-57 & he was elevated there as Professor in the same College.

In 1953, when he had returned from Shikarpur, he had joined a new established social organization-cum-N.G.O namely "Sindhi Adbi Sangat" at Karachi. In this organization he had also played very active role and till his death he remained its member and enjoyed status as Honorary Director.

In the year 1957-58 he had started his new career as an Advocate at Karachi. He had not joined any party but he had served various political parties by pleading the cases of its workers and leaders as their Honorary Counsel. He earned a good name in this field as leading lawyer of High Court & Supreme Court of Pakistan.

In the year 1972-73 he had also joined a political party "National Awami Party".

He was a writer and poet as well. He was author of many books and had translated many books and articles of other languages into Sindhi language. In this field he had gained popularity when he had translated an English Novel of Leo Tolstoy namely What Is To Be Done.

He died on 26 September 2007.

External links
http://sindhikitab.net/corner/nooruddin_sarki/main.html

1927 births
2007 deaths
Pakistani women lawyers
20th-century Pakistani lawyers